Flavio Cipolla and Dominik Meffert were the defending champions, but chose not to participate .

Tristan Lamasine and Albano Olivetti won the title, defeating Nikola Mektić and Antonio Šančić 6–2, 4–6, [10–7] in the final .

Seeds

Draw

References
 Main Draw

Open BNP Paribas Banque de Bretagne - Doubles
Open BNP Paribas Banque de Bretagne